The Hamilton–Brantford–Cambridge Trails are a network of multiuse interurban recreational rail trails connecting several municipalities in southern Ontario, Canada. The trails are part of the Southern Ontario Loop of the Trans Canada Trail.

Gordon Glaves Memorial Pathway
The first portion of the Hamilton–Brantford–Cambridge Trails to be completed was named the Gordon Glaves Memorial Pathway in 1993.

Cambridge to Paris Rail Trail
The second portion of the Hamilton–Brantford–Cambridge Trails is the Cambridge to Paris Rail Trail, which was opened in 1994 along the right of way of the now-defunct Lake Erie and Northern Railway. It then continues on to Paris until officially terminating and becoming the SC Johnson Trail.

Hamilton to Brantford Rail Trail
In 1996, the Hamilton to Brantford Rail Trail was the third portion of the Hamilton–Brantford–Cambridge Trails to be completed. It runs  from Hamilton to Brantford through the towns of Dundas and Jerseyville. The entire former railway bed is surfaced with stone dust and marked with a post at each kilometre, with frequent benches by the side of the path. From Brantford to Jerseyville the trail is owned and maintained by the Grand River Conservation Authority with the Jerseyville-Hamilton section similarly owned by The Hamilton Region Conservation Authority.

Beginning in Hamilton just north of the Chedoke Municipal Golf Course, the trail runs West over Ontario Highway 403, through Ainslie Wood and into the Dundas Valley Conservation Area. Parking and washroom facilities are available at the Dundas Valley Trail Centre,  from the trail head.

The trail then descends through farmland to Jerseyville, where another parking lot is located at kilometre 18.5. It continues in a nearly straight line for several kilometres before turning South, crossing under the 403 and passing another parking area at the  point. The final  run through Brantford to connect with the Gordon Glaves Memorial Pathway.

SC Johnson Trail
The SC Johnson Trail (or SC Johnson Rail Trail) follows another section of abandoned Lake Erie and Northern Railway right of way between Paris and Brantford. It connects to the Gordon Glaves Memorial Pathway in Brantford.

The trail opened in 1998, completing the network of off-road trails from Hamilton to Cambridge.

See also
 Golden Horseshoe
 List of rail trails
 List of trails in Canada

External links
 Conservation Hamilton Brochure

References

Transport in Cambridge, Ontario
Bike paths in the Regional Municipality of Waterloo
Rail trails in Ontario
Geography of Hamilton, Ontario
Parks in Hamilton, Ontario